Pelvic organ prolapse (POP) is characterized by descent of pelvic organs from their normal positions. In women, the condition usually occurs when the pelvic floor collapses after gynecological cancer treatment, childbirth or heavy lifting.

In men, it may occur after the prostate gland is removed. The injury occurs to fascia membranes and other connective structures that can result in cystocele, rectocele or both. Treatment can involve dietary and lifestyle changes, physical therapy, or surgery.

Types 
 Anterior vaginal wall prolapse
 Cystocele (bladder into vagina)
 Urethrocele (urethra into vagina)
 Cystourethrocele (both bladder and urethra)
 Posterior vaginal wall prolapse
 Enterocele (small intestine into vagina)
 Rectocele (rectum into vagina)
 Sigmoidocele
 Apical vaginal prolapse
 Uterine prolapse (uterus into vagina)
 Vaginal vault prolapse (roof of vagina) – after hysterectomy

Grading
Pelvic organ prolapses are graded either via the Baden–Walker System, Shaw's System, or the Pelvic Organ Prolapse Quantification (POP-Q) System.

Shaw's System
Anterior wall
 Upper 2/3 cystocele
 Lower 1/3 urethrocele

Posterior wall
 Upper 1/3 enterocele
 Middle 1/3 rectocele
 Lower 1/3 deficient perineum

Uterine prolapse
 Grade 0 Normal position
 Grade 1 descent into vagina not reaching introitus
 Grade 2 descent up to the introitus
 Grade 3 descent outside the introitus
 Grade 4 Procidentia

Baden–Walker

POP-Q

Management 
Vaginal prolapses are treated according to the severity of symptoms.

Non-surgical
With conservative measures, such as changes in diet and fitness, Kegel exercises, and pelvic floor physical therapy.

With a pessary, a rubber or silicone rubber device fitted to the patient which is inserted into the vagina and may be retained for up to several months. Pessaries are a good choice of treatment for women who wish to maintain fertility, are poor surgical candidates, or who may not be able to attend physical therapy. Pessaries require a provider to fit the device, but most can be removed, cleaned, and replaced by the woman herself. Pessaries should be offered to women considering surgery as a non-surgical alternative.

Surgery
Surgery (for example native tissue repair, biological graft repair, absorbable and non-absorbable mesh repair, colpopexy, or colpocleisis) is used to treat symptoms such as bowel or urinary problems, pain, or a prolapse sensation. When operating a pelvic organ prolapse, introducing a mid-urethral sling during or after surgery seems to reduce stress urinary incontinence. Transvaginal repair seems to be more effective than transanal repair in posterior wall prolapse, but adverse effects cannot be excluded. According to the FDA, serious complications are "not rare."

Evidence does not support the use of transvaginal surgical mesh compared with native tissue repair for anterior compartment prolapse owing to increased morbidity. For posterior vaginal repair, the use of mesh or graft material does not seem to provide any benefits. 

Compared to native tissue repair, transvaginal permanent mesh likely reduces both the perception of vaginal prolapse sensation, and the risk of recurrent prolapse and of having repeat surgery for prolapse. However, transvaginal mesh (TVM) has a greater risk of bladder injury and of needing repeat surgery for stress urinary incontinence or mesh exposure. Also, the use of a TVM in treating vaginal prolapses is associated with side effects including pain, infection, and organ perforation. 

Safety and efficacy of many newer meshes is unknown. Thousands of class action lawsuits have been filed and settled against several manufacturers of TVM devices.

Epidemiology
Genital prolapse occurs in about 316 million women worldwide as of 2010 (9.3% of all females).

Research
To study POP, various animal models are employed: non-human primates, sheep, pigs, rats, and others.

See also 
 Perineometer
 Pessary

References

External links 

Noninflammatory disorders of female genital tract
Vagina